Sainte-Reine may refer to:

Saint Regina (martyr), early Christian martyr of France
Sainte-Reine, Haute-Saône, a commune in the French region of Franche-Comté
Sainte-Reine, Savoie, a commune in the French region of Rhône-Alpes
Alise-Sainte-Reine
Sainte-Reine-de-Bretagne